Trechus rarus is a species of ground beetle in the subfamily Trechinae, found in China. It was described by Schmidt in 2009.

References

rarus
Beetles described in 2009